Year 1062 (MLXII) was a common year starting on Tuesday (link will display the full calendar) of the Julian calendar.

Events 
 By place 

 Europe 
 Spring – Coup of Kaiserswerth: The 11-year-old King Henry IV is abducted, as a result of a conspiracy of German nobles led by Anno II, archbishop of Cologne. Henry's education and training is supervised by Anno, who acts as his regent and is called his magister (his "master" or "teacher"). Empress Agnes of Poitou (Henry's mother) resigns the throne, and Anno with the archbishops Siegfried I and Adalbert of Hamburg takes her place.

 Britain 
 Winter – Harold Godwinson leads a successful campaign against King Gruffydd ap Llywelyn. He attacks and captures Rhuddlan Castle in northern Wales, but Gruffydd manages to escape.

 Africa 
 The Almoravids overrun modern-day Morocco, and establish an intercontinental kingdom, stretching from Spain to Senegal.
 The Banu Khurasan, a vassal of the Hammdid Dynasty, begin to rule the north of Ifriqiya (modern Tunisia).
 Marrakech is founded by the Almoravids which becomes their capital.

 By topic 

 Religion 
 Affligem Abbey, of the Order of St. Benedict, is founded in Affligem (modern Belgium).

Births 
 Bjørn Svendsen, Danish nobleman (approximate date)
 Fujiwara no Moromichi, Japanese nobleman (d. 1099)
 Nicephorus Bryennius, Byzantine statesman (d. 1137)
 Nicephorus Komnenos, Byzantine aristocrat

Deaths 
 January 27 – Adelaide of Hungary, German duchess 
 February 2 – Atenulf I, Lombard nobleman
 March 9 – Herbert II, French nobleman
 May 20 – Bao Zheng, Chinese politician (b. 999)
 October 22 
 Abe no Sadato, Japanese nobleman
 Fujiwara no Tsunekiyo, Japanese nobleman 
 Abu Mansur Fulad Sutun, Buyid emir of Fars
 Al-Mu'izz ibn Badis, Zirid ruler of Ifriqiya (b. 1008)
 Al-Quda'i, Fatimid preacher and historian 
 Emma of Provence, French noblewoman
 Geoffrey I, French nobleman (approximate date)
 Mu'izz al-Dawla Thimal, Mirdasid emir of Aleppo
 Nissim ben Jacob, Tunisian Jewish rabbi (b. 990)
 William IV, count of Weimar and Orlamünde
 Ibn al-Timnah, Emir of Syracuse

References